

Events
Vincent Gigante retires from boxing and becomes involved in organized crime.
Joseph Ida succeeds G.Dovi as leader of the Philadelphia crime family.
January – Lucky Luciano is pardoned and released from jail by New York Governor Thomas Dewey, as part of an arrangement for Luciano providing intelligence during World War II, and deported to Sicily.
February 2–9 – Shortly before his deportation, federal authorities transfer Luciano from Great Meadow Prison to Ellis Island where he remains until boarding the Laura Keene for Sicily.
June 24 – James M. Ragen is ambushed while stopped at Pershing Road and seriously wounded in the arms and legs by a shotgun blast from syndicate gunman, including William Block. Although beginning to recover from his wounds, he died from mercury poisoning on August 14. Although David "Yiddles" Miller, a West Side illegal gambling racketeer and former member of Ragen's Colts along with Ragen, is indicted for his murder, the case is nol prossed.
July – A conference is held by the National Crime Syndicate in Atlantic City, New Jersey.
October – A conference is held in Havana, Cuba which is attended by syndicate leaders including Meyer Lansky and Luciano.
December 22 – The Havana Conference is held by the National Crime Syndicate, where the rivalry between Luciano and Vito Genovese is discussed (resulting in Luciano being elected Capo Di Tutti Cappi), as well discussions on the matter of Benjamin Siegel following the losses of the Las Vegas casino The Flamingo.

Births
James Eppolito, Gambino crime family member
Gene Gotti, member of the Gambino crime family
January 3 – Antonio Rotolo, future boss of the Pagliarelli clan
January 8 – Miguel Ángel Félix Gallardo, Mexican drug lord and head of the Guadalajara Cartel
February 23 – Louis Daidone "Louis Bagels", Lucchese crime family, acting boss
June 24 – William D'Elia, current leader of the Bufalino crime family
December 21 – Jimmy Coonan, co-leader of the Westies

Deaths
June 24 – James M. Ragen, Chicago mobster and co-founder of the Ragen's Colts street gang
April 13 – Tommy Vescetti, Los Angeles mobster, assassinated in cafe.
Organized crime
Years in organized crime